Nino Gurieli (born December 7, 1961) is a Georgian chess player. She received the FIDE titles of International Master (IM) in 1997 and Woman Grandmaster (WGM) in 1980. She is a descendant of the noble family of Gurieli and married to Grandmaster Zurab Sturua. 

Gurieli won the Georgian women's chess championship in 1976. She has competed for the Women's World Chess Championship several times, most recently she competed in the Women's World Chess Championship, 2010, where she went out in the first round. In recent years, she has also been acting as a captain of Georgian Women's Olympic Team.

References

External links 
 
 
 

1961 births
Living people
Female chess players from Georgia (country)
Chess International Masters
Chess woman grandmasters
Nino